Voltron is an animated television series produced by World Events Productions for a total of 124 episodes. The series is an adaptation of the Japanese super robot anime series Beast King Go-Lion, which was dubbed into English and edited to create Voltron episodes. Later episodes also use footage from the mecha anime Armored Fleet Dairugger XV.

Premise

The first season is about five pilots who command five robot lions which combine to form Voltron. These pilots use these machines to protect the planet Arus from the evil Warlord  King Zarkon and witch Haggar who creates monsters called Robeasts to terrorize the planet ruled by Princess Allura.

Vehicle Voltron

The second season of the show was called Vehicle Voltron, based on Armored Fleet Dairugger XV, which spawned also a television special called Voltron: Fleet of Doom. The premise of season two is the Galaxy Alliance's home worlds have become overcrowded and search for new planets to colonise. This puts the Alliance in conflict with the Drule empire.

The protagonists are divided into teams. Each team is specialized in gathering data or fighting in their area of expertise. Each squad combines their vehicles into a bigger machine, with each vehicle differing among the three teams. These fighters are:

 The Aqua Fighter (Sea Team)
 The Turbo Terrain Fighter (Land Team)
 The Strato Fighter (Air Team)

Voice cast

Neil Ross as Keith and Pidge
Michael Bell as Lance and Sven  
Lennie Weinrib as Hunk and Prince Lotor  
B. J. Ward as Princess Allura and Haggar
Peter Cullen as Coran and Narrator
Jack Angel as King Zarkon
Tress MacNeille as Queen Merla

Production and development

Ted Koplar assembled a team in Los Angeles to transform Go-Lion into what would become Voltron. Peter Keefe was brought aboard as Executive Producer, with Franklin Cofod as the Director. Since they had no means of translating the Japanese series into English, Keefe and Cofod surmised the plots, commissioned writer Jameson Brewer to write all-new dialogue, edited out the more violent scenes, and remixed the audio into stereo format. The series was an immediate hit in the United States, topping the syndication market for children's programs in the mid-1980s.

The Japanese series Future Robot Daltanious was originally planned to be adapted by World Events Productions as part of Voltron. When requesting master tapes from Toei Animation for translation purposes, the World Events Productions producers requested "[the] ones with the lion." Mistakenly, Toei then proceeded to ship World Events copies of Beast King Go-Lion, another "combining-robot" cartoon which featured lion-shaped fighting robot starships. Because the World Events producers greatly preferred Go-Lion to Daltanious, the Go-Lion episodes were adapted instead, going on to become the most popular portion of the original Voltron run. A third version/series of Voltron based on yet another Japanese series, Lightspeed Electroid Albegas, was also in progress, but it was dropped when World Events Productions joined with Toei to make new Go-Lion-based shows, due to that show's popularity over the Dairugger run.

Changes from the Japanese version

Though airing in syndication, which offered other anime shows such as Robotech greater freedom to deal with subject matter such as death that were off-limits in most US network children's programming, WEP's adaptation of Voltron was heavily edited to conform to the more conservative standards of children's television in the United States, as well as the standard name change of characters and concepts in Go-Lion and Dairugger.

Plot changes

Lion Force & Go-Lion
In Voltron, the show begins with the five pilots sent by the Galaxy Alliance, whose space-exploration mission takes them to a planet devastated by war. In Voltron, the pilots arrive on Arus and are captured and taken to Planet Doom. They then escape, return to Arus, and become the pilots of the robot lions and Voltron. In Go-Lion, the initial scenes are actually of Earth; the pilots have returned from their mission (in the then-futuristic year of 1999) to find that the entire population of Earth has been killed in a nuclear war. They are then captured and taken to Planet Galra, where the plot proceeds similarly, only the planet they find the lions on is called Altea.  In the Voltron version, some footage of the pilots' arrival on Arus was taken from Armored Fleet Dairugger XV.
Scenes of torture and atrocities inflicted by the alien conquerors on their slaves (such as a "contest" where alien soldiers would be rewarded according to how many prisoners they managed to decapitate in a given time) and some shots of corpses were removed.
In Go-Lion, Takashi 'Shiro' Shirogane (Sven in Voltron), the original pilot of Blue Lion, is killed in a battle with Honerva, and his similar-looking younger brother Ryou appears later in the series to join in the fight against Emperor Daibazaal. In Voltron, dialog was inserted to indicate that Sven is merely injured and has been sent away to a hospital planet to recover, and the character of Ryou was rewritten entirely into Sven being enslaved after said planet was taken over, then escaping and managing to reunite with his friends.
In Go-Lion, Hys (Nanny) is fatally shot in the heart while protecting Raible (Coran). This scene was completely removed from Voltron, and later episodes used stock footage from earlier in the series to insert the character into scenes that took place after her original death.
In Go-Lion, a slave girl named Lisa was a survivor of the nuclear war. Near the end of her debut episode, Tsuyoshi 'Hothead' Seidou (Hunk in Voltron) urges her to wake up and join in the fight against Emperor Daibazaal (King Zarkon in Voltron), however she is too crushed by her despair to trust even a fellow human (that race being responsible for the destruction of her homeworld) and chooses to step off a cliff the two were standing on, rather than live without her brother. In Voltron, this sequence was removed, and it was explained to the audience that this girl, now named Twyla, had been allowed to go home to her own planet (a planet other than Earth).
 In episode 21 of Go-Lion, there are implications that Prince Sincline (Prince Lotor in Voltron) sexually enslaved Princess Amue (Romelle in Voltron) when she was his prisoner, due to her physical similarities to Princess Fala. The Voltron dialogues imply that he tortured her instead.

Episodes

Home media

The show was released on DVD by the likes of Media Blasters and Gaiam Vivendi Entertainment, and was released on a Complete Series DVD set by Universal Pictures Home Entertainment with their distribution deal with DreamWorks Animation on September 10, 2019.

Reception

The show was ranked the 76th best animated series by IGN.

Video game

A video game based on the 1984 show was released in 2011 for PlayStation 3 and Xbox 360 consoles.

References

External links

 
 

 
1984 American television series debuts
1985 American television series endings
1980s American animated television series
1980s American science fiction television series
1984 Japanese television series debuts
1985 Japanese television series endings
American children's animated action television series
American children's animated adventure television series
American children's animated science fantasy television series
American children's animated superhero television series
Japanese children's animated action television series
Japanese children's animated adventure television series
Japanese children's animated science fantasy television series
Japanese children's animated superhero television series
Anime-influenced Western animated television series
Adventure anime and manga
American Broadcasting Company original programming
Anime Works
Australian Broadcasting Corporation original programming
Animated television series about robots
English-language television shows
Science fiction anime and manga
Super robot anime and manga
Television series set on fictional planets
Toonami